Nannoarctia conjuncta is a moth of the family Erebidae first described by George Hampson in 1901. It is found in Indonesia.

Subspecies
Nannoarctia conjuncta conjuncta (Lombok Island)
Nannoarctia conjuncta javanica Dubatolov, Haynes & Kishida, 2010 (Java)
Nannoarctia conjuncta sumbana Dubatolov, Haynes & Kishida, 2010 (Sumba Island)
Nannoarctia conjuncta williami (Rothschild, 1910) (Bali)

References

Moths described in 1901
Spilosomina